Dagmar may refer to:

People 
 Dagmar (given name), a feminine Scandinavian and German given name
 Berthe Dagmar (1884–1934), French film actress
 Dagmar (actress) (1921–2001), main stage name of American actress Virginia Ruth Egnor
 Dagmar (Puerto Rican entertainer) (born 1955), Puerto Rican entertainer Dagmar Rivera

Places 
 County of Dagmar, Queensland, Australia
 Dagmar, Montana, United States, an unincorporated community
 Dagmar Ski Resort in Uxbridge, Ontario

Other uses 

 1669 Dagmar (1934 RS), a main-belt asteroid
 Cyclone Dagmar, which caused severe damage in Norway in 2011
 Dagmar (automobile), sports version of the Crawford automobile
 Dagmar bumpers, a slang term for conical styling elements in 1950s automobile bumpers and grilles
 DAGMAR marketing, an advertising model
 Dagmar (novel), a novel by Zlatko Topčić
 The Dagmar, a fictional public house on the BBC Soap opera EastEnders
 Queen Dagmar, Bean's biological mother in the television series Disenchantment